Cesina is a toponym of Langobard origin that is used in southern Italy, especially in Campania. It derives from the Latin word caesi and the Latin verb caedere, to which the Langobard suffix -na is added.

History 

The concept was introduced with the creation of the Duchy of Benevento by the Lombards around 590 AD. It defined a wooded area designated for woodcutting. These are precisely defined in the first tome of Antiquitates Italicae Medii Aevi, year 1005 AD, column 183 written by Ludovico Antonio Muratori in 1738-43. It was then further defined as Silva cædua (Latin) in the Du Cange, et al., Glossarium mediae et infimae Latinitatis, Niort: L. Favre, 1883–1887 (10 vol.). These wooded areas were often deforested to make room for urban settlements and cultivated countryside.

Places called Cesina
Places called Cesina include:
 Cesina, ancient fiefdom owned by Di Sangro family.
 Cesina, Capri, Naples, Campania
 Contrada Cesina, Molinara, Benevento, Campania
 Contrada Cesina, Tufino, Naples, Campania
 Contrada Cesina Nuova, Avellino, Campania
 Contrada Cesina, Viggianello, Potenza, Basilicata
 Via Cesina, San Pietro, Montoro, Avellino, Campania
 Via Cesina, San Valentino Torio, Salerno, Campania
 Via Cesina Pugliano, San Valentino Torio, Salerno, Campania
 Via Cesina, Striano, Naples, Campania
 Via Cesina, San Marzano sul Sarno, Salerno, Campania
 Via Cesina, Marano di Napoli, Naples, Campania
 Via Cesina, Piano di Sorrento, Naples, Campania
 Via Belvedere Cesina, Capri, Naples, Campania
 Via Cesina, Capri, Naples, Campania
 Strada della Cesina, Latina, Lazio
 I.C. San Rocco-San Marco-Cesina, Marano di Napoli, Naples, Campania

Places with names derived from Cesina

Cesinali, Avellino, Campania, southern Italy is derived from the toponym.

The term Cesine is used to refer to it as a plural. Charles II of Spain had granted his doctor, Raimondo di Odiboni, the Cesine of Afragola as a fief for services rendered. The Cesine were once wooded land that were converted to farmland by cutting the trees and burning their trunks. 

Places called Cesine include:

 Cesine, Benevento, Campania
 Cesine, Avellino, Campania
 Cesine, Potenza, Basilicata
 Via Cesine, Benevento, Campania
 Via Cesine, Avellino, Campania
 Via Cesine Prata di Principato Ultra, Avellino, Campania
 Via Cesine, Tocco Caudio, Benevento, Campania
 Via Cesine Di Sopra, Cerreto Sannita, Benevento, Campania
 Via cesine di sotto, Cerreto Sannita, Benevento, Campania
 Via Cesine, Castelvenere, Benevento, Campania
 Via Cesine, Marsicovetere, Potenza, Basilicata
 Via Cesine, Vallata, Avellino, Campania
 Le Cesine, Lecce, Apulia, southern Italy.

In central Italy the toponym contracts in Cesi, Terni, which gives origin to Cesi (surname).

Other derivatives from the toponym in Northern Italy include:

 Cesano Boscone, Milan, Lombardy
 Cesano Maderno, Monza Brianza, Lombardy
 Cesana Torinese, Turin, Piedmont
 Sauze di Cesana, Turin, Piedmont
 Cesana Brianza, Lecco, Lombardy

The Italian municipality of Cesa, Caserta, Campania originates from the toponym.

Places with names not derived from Cesina
Cesena, an Italian municipality, does not derive from this toponym but from the Latin suffix -caes ('cut'), which refers to a river and not trees.

Cesino, a frazione of the city of Genoa, in the Pontedecimo district, derives from the Ligurian word çêxin, which in Italian means "small cherry tree."

See also

Češina Strana, a village in Bosnia and Herzegovina

References

Place name element etymologies
Lombardy
Cities and towns in Lombardy